Mellet v Ireland is a finding from the United Nations Human Rights Committee in 2016 that the Republic of Ireland's abortion laws violated human rights and the International Covenant on Civil and Political Rights by banning abortion in cases of fatal foetal abnormality and by forcing her to travel to the United Kingdom for an abortion.

Background

Amanda Mellet
Amanda Mellet became pregnant in 2011. In November 2011, in the 21st week of pregnancy, a routine scans in the Rotunda Hospital showed the foetus was suffering Edwards syndrome, a fatal condition. Staff at the hospital told her that she could not have an abortion in that juristicion but would have to "travel". With the help of a family planning clinic, she, and her husband, travelled to Liverpool Women's Hospital for a termination. They had to return to Ireland only 12 hours after the termination because they could not afford to stay later. The procedure cost €2,000, as there is no financial assistance from the State or private health insurers for women who terminate pregnancies abroad. The Rotunda did not provide bereavement counselling to parents who terminate the pregnancy for fatal foetal abnormalities, but it will provide such counselling to women who do not terminate. The hospital did not provide any options regarding the foetus's remains, so they left them behind. The ashes were unexpectedly delivered three weeks later by courier.

In February 2012, Mellet and her husband spoke about their case to The Irish Times, which used the pseudonyms "Rachel and Tim". After the case, she was involved with the advocacy group Termination for Medical Reasons.

The Center for Reproductive Rights filed the complaint on Mellet's behalf.
This was the first time that an international body found that criminalising abortion in cases of fatal foetal abnormality violated the right to be free from torture, inhuman and degrading treatment or punishment.

Abortion law in Ireland

Abortion was banned in nearly all cases in the Republic of Ireland until 2018. There was a constitutional protection for the unborn after the 1983 Eighth Amendment. The 2013 law, the Protection of Life During Pregnancy Act 2013 allowed for abortion in case of danger to the life of the mother. In June 2017 the Citizens Assembly recommended holding a referendum to repeal the 8th Amendment. A referendum was held on May 25, 2018, to repeal the 8th Amendment, which passed with a large majority (66.4%) of the vote.

Ruling
In 2016, the United Nations Human Rights Committee found that Ireland's abortion law violated the United Nations International Covenant on Civil and Political Rights and called for the government to offer her compensation and counselling and for it to change its laws to allow for abortion in cases of fatal foetal abnormality.

The committee found that she had been subjected to discrimination and cruel, inhuman or degrading treatment as a result of Ireland's legal prohibition of abortion. The committee said that in addition to the shame and stigma associated with the criminalization of abortion of a fatally-ill foetus, Mellet's suffering was aggravated by the obstacles that she faced in getting information about the appropriate medical options.

Reaction

Amanda Mellet

Ms Mellet welcomed the ruling, and called on abortion to be decriminalised.

Irish Government response

The formal response to the finding from the Irish Government (delivered on 1 December 2016) was to explain the Citizens' Assembly process, which would report to the Oireachtas by mid 2017.

Abortion rights campaigners

The Abortion Rights Campaign welcomed the ruling, and called it a milestone.

Terminations for Medical Reasons welcomed the decision of the committee saying "The Committee has determined that Ireland, by refusing access to safe and legal abortion services, is abusing women by treating them in a cruel, inhuman and degrading manner."

The Irish Council for Civil Liberties said the report "cranks up the pressure" on the Government to reform Ireland's "antediluvian" abortion laws.

Amnesty International in Ireland welcomed the ruling, calling it "ground breaking".

Anti-abortion campaigners

Youth Defence strongly condemned the ruling, calling it "deplorable".

The Pro Life Campaign condemned the judgement, and accused the UN of being a "de facto lobby group for abortion", and criticised the offer of compensation.

The Catholic Archbishop of Armagh, Eamon Martin opposed the finding, saying abortion was a matter for the Irish people, and reaffirmed the Catholic view that abortion should not be allowed in this case.

Compensation
In November 2016, the government paid her €30,000 for the suffering caused by having to travel to another country. Minister for Health Simon Harris (from Fine Gael), Labour's Alan Kelly and Fianna Fáil's Billy Kelleher met Mellet and her family to offer the compensation and counselling just one week before the deadline to reply from the UN. This was the first time the Irish government had agreed to compensate someone in such a case. Some legal sources do not think this will set a precedent for the Irish courts, whereas a member of the UN committee said that if another woman took a similar case before the committee, Ireland would have to pay compensation.

Further cases
In 2017, there was a similar case, Whelan v Ireland in which the government paid the woman €30,000 in compensation.

See also

 Abortion in the Republic of Ireland
 D v Ireland
 Miss D

References

External links
 Findings of the committee

Abortion case law
Abortion in the Republic of Ireland
2016 in the Republic of Ireland
United Nations Human Rights Committee case law